Captain Thomas Riversdale Colyer-Fergusson VC (18 February 1896 − 31 July 1917) was a British Army officer and an English recipient of the Victoria Cross (VC), the highest and most prestigious award for gallantry in the face of the enemy that can be awarded to British and Commonwealth forces.

Early life and education 
Born in London in February 1896 to Thomas Colyer Colyer Fergusson (later Sir Thomas Colyer Fergusson) and the late Beatrice Stanley, he was educated at Summer Fields and Harrow School before going up to Oriel College, Oxford.

First World War 
Colyer-Fergusson was 21 years old, and an acting captain in the 2nd Battalion, The Northamptonshire Regiment, British Army when performed the deed on 31 July 1917 during the Battle of Pilckem Ridge at Bellewaarde, Belgium which earned him the Victoria Cross. After performing the deed, Colyer-Fergusson died of a gunshot wound from a sniper shot.

His Victoria Cross is part of the collection at the Museum of The Northamptonshire Regiment (48th & 58th Foot), Northampton, England and he is buried in Menin Road South Military Commonwealth War Graves Commission Cemetery. There is a memorial in his memory in St Peter's Church, Ightham, Kent. His name also appears on the war memorial at Ifield Church, Gravesend, Kent.

The VC medal is presently (July 2017) on loan to the National Trust, and on display at Ightham Mote, his family home.

References

Monuments to Courage (David Harvey, 1999)
The Register of the Victoria Cross (This England, 1997)
VCs of the First World War - Passchendaele 1917 (Stephen Snelling, 1998)

External links

No Time to Spare? A History of Summer Fields War Dead (Chris Sparrow, 2006)https://web.archive.org/web/20060518190326/http://www.summerfields.oxon.sch.uk/user_pages/no_time_to_spare/NTTS.php

1896 births
1917 deaths
Northamptonshire Regiment officers
British World War I recipients of the Victoria Cross
British Army personnel of World War I
British military personnel killed in World War I
People educated at Summer Fields School
People from Westminster
People educated at Harrow School
Alumni of Oriel College, Oxford
British Army recipients of the Victoria Cross
Burials at Menin Road South Military Commonwealth War Graves Commission Cemetery
Deaths by firearm in Belgium
Military personnel from London